Bradley Nelson "Brad" Garcia (born 1986) is an American lawyer and official in the United States Department of Justice who is a nominee to serve as a United States circuit judge of the United States Court of Appeals for the District of Columbia Circuit.

Education 

Garcia earned a bachelor's degree in 2008 in international studies and economics from Johns Hopkins University, where he also was president of the university's chapter of the Pi Kappa Alpha fraternity. Garcia then earned a Juris Doctor degree from Harvard Law School in 2011.

Career 

Garcia served as a law clerk for Judge Thomas B. Griffith of the United States Court of Appeals for the District of Columbia Circuit from 2011 to 2012 and for Associate Justice Elena Kagan of the Supreme Court of the United States from 2012 to 2013. He was a litigator at the law firm of O'Melveny & Myers from 2013 to 2022, where he led appellate litigation with a client list that included Google, Warner Brothers and Ford Motor Company. Garcia was appointed to be partner in late 2020. Garcia argued more than a dozen times before federal and state appeals courts including his first case before the Supreme Court of the United States in 2021, a pro bono immigration case. In February 2022, he joined the United States Department of Justice's Office of Legal Counsel, where he is a deputy assistant attorney general.

Notable cases 

Garcia was also part of the legal team representing El Paso County, Texas in a suit challenging the diversion of U.S. Department of Defense funds to build a border wall.

In 2019, Garcia represented a man seeking better mental health treatment in a Pennsylvania prison. A unanimous panel of the United States Court of Appeals for the Third Circuit ruled in favor of the prisoner.

In 2019, Garcia was co-counsel for Jason Daniel Sims, who pleaded guilty to being a felon in possession of a firearm, in violation of 18 U.S.C. § 922(g)(1). Sims was sentenced as an armed career criminal, and he appealed. The Armed Career Criminal Act ("ACCA") imposes a mandatory fifteen-year minimum sentence on a defendant convicted of being a felon in possession of a firearm or ammunition who has three or more previous convictions for violent felonies or serious drug offenses. 18 U.S.C. § 924(e)(1). The district court designated Sims an armed career criminal based on four convictions: two Arkansas residential burglaries and two serious drug offenses. Sims appealed, arguing that his previous Arkansas burglary convictions do not qualify as violent felonies and that he therefore lacks the three or more convictions necessary to qualify as an armed career criminal. 

In 2020, Garcia was the counsel of record in June Medical Services, LLC v. Russo, challenging Louisiana’s law requiring doctors who perform abortions to have admitting privileges at a local hospital.  

In 2022, Garcia was co-counsel for Bel Air Auto Auction, Inc. in their lawsuit against Great Northern Insurance Company. Bel Air's claims stemmed from Great Northern's denial of insurance benefits Bel Air asserts Great Northern owed it to cover business loss Bel Air incurred during the COVID-19 pandemic.

Nomination to court of appeals 

On June 15, 2022, President Joe Biden nominated Garcia to serve as a United States circuit judge of the United States Court of Appeals for the District of Columbia Circuit. President Biden nominated Garcia to the seat to be vacated by Judge Judith W. Rogers, who subsequently assumed senior status on September 1, 2022. On July 27, 2022, a hearing on his nomination was held before the Senate Judiciary Committee. During his confirmation hearing, Republican senators questioned him on cases that he was involved with that dealt with gun rights and abortion access. On September 15, 2022, his nomination was reported out of committee by a 12–10 vote. On January 3, 2023, his nomination was returned to the President under Rule XXXI, Paragraph 6 of the United States Senate; he was renominated later the same day. On February 2, 2023, his nomination was reported out of committee by an 11–9 vote. His nomination is pending before the United States Senate. If confirmed, he would be the first Latino to serve as a judge on the D.C. Circuit.

References

External links 

 Appearances at the U.S. Supreme Court from the Oyez Project

1986 births
Living people
21st-century American lawyers
Harvard Law School alumni
Hispanic and Latino American lawyers
Johns Hopkins University alumni
Law clerks of the Supreme Court of the United States
People associated with O'Melveny & Myers
People from Gaithersburg, Maryland
United States Department of Justice lawyers